Myopordon pulchellum is a species of flowering plants in the tribe Cardueae within the family Asteraceae.

Description 
The plant is sub-acaulescent with a single flowering head, it measures . The briefly petiolated leaves are arranged in a rosette around a thick rhizome; the leaves form a sheath around the base. The leaves are appressed, pinnatifid or lyrate and the contour is ovate to lanceolate; both leave faces are canescent with ciliated and spiny margins. The pant's receptacle has silky trichomes. Involucral bracts are canescent and covered with cobweb-like hairs, each bract ends with a single spine.

Distribution 
The plant is endemic to Lebanon.

References 

Flora of Lebanon
Endemic flora of Lebanon
Cynareae